Ivan C. Rutledge was the twelfth Dean of the Ohio State University Moritz College of Law.

Education

Rutledge received a law degree from the Duke University School of Law and master's of law degree from the Columbia Law School.

Duke University School of Law alumni
Columbia Law School alumni
Moritz College of Law faculty
Deans of law schools in the United States
American legal scholars